Ludwig Burger (19 September 1825 Krakow - 22 October 1884 Berlin) was a German historical painter, illustrator, and medallist.

Biography
He studied at the Berlin Art Academy, at the same time working at book illustrating; he was also a pupil of Thomas Couture in Paris. Among his best drawings are the illustrations for the works of La Fontaine and a collection of 20 plates known as Die Kanone. After 1869, he devoted himself to decorative painting, his most important work in this line being the walls and ceilings in the Berlin City Hall (1870) and the colossal figures symbolizing the warlike virtues at the School of Cadets at Lichterfelde (1878).

See also
 List of German painters

Notes

References

External links

1825 births
1884 deaths
19th-century German painters
19th-century German male artists
German male painters
German illustrators